The 1933 Clemson Tigers football team was an American football team that represented Clemson College in the Southern Conference during the 1933 college football season. In their third season under head coach Jess Neely, the Tigers compiled a 3–6–2 record (1–1 against conference opponents), finished sixth in the conference, and was outscored by a total of 98 to 50.

The first night game in Clemson's history was played October 13 against George Washington at Griffith Stadium in Washington, D. C.

John Heinemann was the team captain. Two Clemson players were selected as first-team players on the 1933 All-Southern Conference football team: guard John Heinemann and tackle John Troutman.

Schedule

References

Clemson
Clemson Tigers football seasons
Clemson Tigers football